Corymore Productions is an American television production company that was created and founded in 1987 by producer Peter Shaw, the late husband of actress Angela Lansbury.

Shaw launched Corymore Productions at Universal Studios with his two sons, David and Anthony, where for twelve years they co-produced the long-running hit television series Murder, She Wrote, as well as several television movies featuring Lansbury. The company, which produced Murder, She Wrote: The Celtic Riddle, hasn't produced anything since 2003.

TV productions
Murder, She Wrote (1984–1996) (produced by Corymore from 1992 to 1996)
Mrs. 'Arris Goes to Paris (1992)
Mrs. Santa Claus (1996)
Murder, She Wrote: South by Southwest (1997)
The Unexpected Mrs. Pollifax (1999)
Murder, She Wrote: A Story to Die For (2000)
Murder, She Wrote: The Last Free Man (2001)
Murder, She Wrote: The Celtic Riddle (2003)

References

External links
Corymore Productions at the Internet Movie Database.

Television production companies of the United States
Mass media companies established in 1987
Entertainment companies based in California
1987 establishments in California
Universal Pictures